Kitimat is a district municipality in the North Coast region of British Columbia, Canada. It is a member municipality of the Regional District of Kitimat–Stikine regional government. The Kitimat Valley is part of the most populous urban district in northwest British Columbia, which includes Terrace to the north along the Skeena River Valley. The city was planned and built by the Aluminum Company of Canada (Alcan) during the 1950s.  Its post office was approved on June 6, 1952.

It is located on tidewater in one of the few wide, flat valleys on the coast of British Columbia. The 2016 census recorded 8,131 citizens.

The District of Kitimat Development Services situates the port of Kitimat as an integral part of the Northwest Corridor connecting North America to the Pacific Ocean and the Pacific Rim.

History

"Kitimat" in the Tsimshian language refers to the Haisla First Nation as the "People of the Snow". Before 1950 the Kitimat township was a small fishing village at the head of the Kitimat Arm of the Douglas Channel, a deepwater fjord.

The municipal town of Kitimat came into existence in 1951 after the Provincial Government of British Columbia invited Alcan to develop hydroelectric facilities to support one of the most power-intensive of all industries—the aluminum smelting industry. The company built a dam,  tunnel, powerhouse,  transmission line, a deep-sea terminal and smelter. The company also designed, laid out and assisted with the initial construction of the city. At the time, the combined development was considered "the most expensive project ever attempted by private industry."

Alcan employed the services of city planner Clarence Stein in order to ensure the community design facilitated an environment that would attract and retain workers, although Alcan intended it to not be a company town. Today, Kitimat benefits from the quality of planning resulting from the Garden City design concept. Stein's design kept industry well separated from the community with large areas for expansion.

The substantial greenspace areas and future expansion concepts designed by Stein have been upheld to this day by the city planners, thereby resulting in a low-density settlement pattern interspersed with forested patches. Also, the Alcan-based city origin and land provenance remain documented in the form of restrictive covenants registered on title.

Economy

Aluminum producer Rio Tinto is the main employer in the municipality. Local government, schools, small manufacturing and service/retail are secondary contributors. Secondary core activities include engineering, import of petrochemical products (methanol and condensate), and metal fabrication. Approximately $5 billion in manufacturing investment is anticipated in the 2010–2015 period with a further $5 billion-plus in the investigative stage over the next decade. Anticipated investment includes an approximately $2 billion modernization to the Rio Tinto Alcan facilities and $3 billion in the Kitimat liquefied natural gas export development on Haisla Industrial Land at Bish Creek. The export facility would see natural gas piped in from the Western Canadian Sedimentary Basin (particularly from shale gas developments such as the Montney and Horn River) and shipped to Asian markets. The LNG Canada project, a joint venture between Shell and affiliates of Mitsubishi Corporation, Korea Gas Corporation and PetroChina would, if permitted, begin construction in 2015 of a gas pipeline from northeastern BC and a LNG export terminal with an expected lifespan of 30 years. The terminal, located on the Douglas Channel near the aluminum refinery, would be able to accommodate two LNG vessels at a time. Annual volume would be 24 million tonnes. In July 2014 the Financial Post reported that Apache Corp. will "completely exit" the Kitimat LNG mega-project planned for B.C.'s West Coast. The U.S. hedge fund Jana Partners LLC has pressured Houston-based Apache to sell its 50% stake in the BC shale gas plays.

Pending energy projects that have identified Kitimat as a strategic gateway include Pacific Northern Gas' Pacific Trail Pipeline (federal and provincial environmental assessments issued) and the Enbridge Northern Gateway Pipelines (currently being reviewed by the National Energy Board).

Additional investigations into clean energy developments include a Kitimat port development project featuring break-bulk port facilities and consideration of the best uses for the former Eurocan Wharf. In addition, the decommissioning of the former Eurocan pulp and paper facilities or a slimmed down operation are still under consideration. There is also renewed interest in mineral development potential in the Kitimat area. The neighbouring community of Terrace is also in advanced stages of approval for a number of clean energy projects along with the associated infrastructure for linking those projects to the provincial electrical grid.

Air services for the community are provided through Northwest Regional Airport, with connections to Prince George, Smithers, and Vancouver.

Kemano hydroelectric project

In the 1920s, the provincial government of British Columbia extensively evaluated the province's hydroelectric generating potential. In the late 1940s, the Canadian Government sought to tap the untapped resources of northwest British Columbia. All this led to the identification of the Eutsuk/Ootsa/Nechako River drainage basin as a potential site for a sizable reservoir. The potential of this vast system of rivers and lakes prompted British Columbia to invite Alcan to conduct a detailed investigation of the area. Alcan was searching for a site for a large aluminum smelter, an activity requiring vast amounts of electricity. Alcan concluded that the area was more than adequate to generate the required electricity, and decided to build a smelter there. The timing was right because the post-World War II boom saw a rising demand for aluminum.

Between 1951 and 1954, after signing the agreement with the British Columbia government for land and water rights, Alcan undertook the Kitimat–Kemano Project, one of the most ambitious Canadian engineering projects of the 20th century. The project required not only building the Kenney Dam to reverse the Nechako River, but also boring a  tunnel under Mt. Dubose, within the Coast Range, to the large hydroelectric Kemano Generating Station built under Mt. Dubose. After avalanches tore away transmission towers, a catenary system was built.

In three years, 6,000 construction workers built the dam, tunnel, powerhouse, transmission line, smelter, and town.

The town of Kitimat was carved out of old-growth forest. The company invested over CA$500 million (equivalent to CA$3.3 billion) and employed over 35,000 workers over the five years required to build the Kenney Dam, the hydropower plant under Mt. Dubose at Kemano, a 250,000 tpy aluminum smelter, a year-round deepwater port, a townsite designed for a population of 50,000, and a paved highway to the outside world. As a result of this project other companies saw the potential of the area, resulting in further industrial development in the Kitimat valley.

LNG Canada terminal project

On 1 October 2018, Royal Dutch Shell and its Asia partners gave formal approval to an estimated $40 billion investment into the construction of a new liquified natural gas port terminal project named LNG Canada, coupled with the construction by a subsidiary of TransCanada of a gas pipeline, known as the Coastal GasLink Pipeline, linking this terminal to the Montney, British Columbia, natural gas field.

If and when completed, LNG Canada should become the first Canadian LNG export ocean terminal, which will compete with other LNG terminals in the US, either existing or planned on the West (Alaska, Washington, Oregon), Gulf (Louisiana, Texas) and Atlantic coasts (Maryland, Virginia).

This new terminal to be built in the port of Kitimat will be connected to the Pacific Ocean via the existing Douglas Channel. This development will add new sensitive ship traffic when the LNG Canada natural gas storage and liquefaction terminal will be completed and operational, which is estimated to be in 2025. The LNG Canada terminal project will see large LNG carrier ships loading liquefied natural gas at the future Kitimat LNG terminal, and sailing along the Douglas Channel to carry it to export destinations, mainly in Asia.

Geography

Climate
Kitimat has an oceanic climate (Köppen climate classification Cfb) with mild summers and cold, snowy winters (much warmer than inland) with significant snowfall averaging 128 inches (325 cm) each year. The rainiest season is fall, with the wettest month, October, having 320 mm of rainfall. There is also a significant drying trend (Mediterranean pattern) in summer, but it’s too rainy to classify as such. Cloud cover is significant, especially in winter, and less than 30% of possible sunshine occurs each year.

Demographics

Ethnicity

Religion 
According to the 2021 census, religious groups in Kitimat included:
Irreligion (4,220 persons or 51.4%)
Christianity (3,690 persons or 44.9%)
Islam (110 persons or 1.3%)
Hinduism (45 persons or 0.5%)
Buddhism (35 persons or 0.4%)
Sikhism (20 persons or 0.2%)
Indigenous Spirituality (10 persons or 0.1%)
Other (75 persons or 0.9%)

Controversies

The Alcan project was not free from controversy. Politicians, aboriginal groups, farmers and residents of the Nechako Lakes District opposed the contractual release of provincial resources with the profits going to a private firm. Many individuals and groups protested the flooding caused by the creation of the new reservoir, with the destruction of homesteads, villages, burial grounds, millions of board feet of prime timber, and the disruption of prime fish habitat on the Nechako River.

In the late 1980s, the company began work on the Kemano Completion Project which would have doubled the generating capacity of the Kemano plant. After Alcan had already bored a second tunnel through the mountain and extended the generating station within the mountain, the provincial government of the day called a halt to the project for a variety of reasons. Having invested over $500 million into the project, Alcan took the provincial government to court. This controversy was settled when Alcan and the provincial government signed the 1997 KCP agreement.

Most of the first decade of the twenty-first century saw the District of Kitimat in court with the Provincial Government over the electricity rights granted to Alcan and its obligations to the Province and to the District.

Rio Tinto Alcan plans to increase the output of its Kitimat smelter from 250,000 MT/Yr to 400,000 MT/Yr and initially committed $300 million to this effort. Since late 2008, relations between Rio Tinto Alcan and the District appear to have become more cordial, with the two parties working to achieve modernization of the aluminum facilities. In December 2011, Rio Tinto Alcan announced its investment of $2.7 billion to complete the modernization of the smelter.

Media

Newspapers
 Kitimat Northern Sentinel

Radio
 FM 92.1 – CFNR-FM, First Nations community/ classic rock (Terrace)
 FM 92.9 – CJFW-FM-1, country (repeats CJFW-FM, Terrace)
 FM 97.7 – CKTK-FM, hot adult contemporary
 FM 100.3 – CFKI-FM, CBC Radio 2 (repeats CBU-FM, Vancouver)
 FM 101.1 – CBUK-FM, CBC Radio One (repeats CFPR, Prince Rupert)
 FM 105.1 – CBUF-FM-5, Première Chaîne (repeats CBUF-FM, Vancouver)

Television
 Channel 3 – CFTK-TV, CTV 2 affiliate (Terrace)
 DTBS cable channel 10

Notable people
Benjamin Arthur - actor
Mark Fitzpatrick - professional ice hockey goaltender
Wayne Kelly - Swimmer. 1984 Los Angeles Olympics.  5th - 4 x 200m freestyle relay.
Jon Kelly - Swimmer.  1988 Seoul Olympics.  7th 200m butterfly, 12th 400m Individual Medley.
Bill Leeb – musician and record producer
Alison Redford - lawyer, Canadian politician, Alberta Progressive Conservative  Leader and  MLA (2011 - 2014), first female Premier of Alberta
Eden Robinson – author

See also 
 List of Panamax ports
 Kitlope Indian Reserve No. 16

Notes

References

External links
www.kitimat.ca

 
Company towns in Canada
District municipalities in British Columbia
Populated places in the Regional District of Kitimat–Stikine
North Coast of British Columbia
Populated places on the British Columbia Coast